Harold Dawson cricketer.

Harold Dawson may also refer to:

Harry Dawson (association footballer), Harold Dawson, footballer
Harold Dawson, see RAM press
Harold Dawson, fictional character in A Few Good Men

See also
Harry Dawson (disambiguation)